The following is a list of recorded songs by Canadian rap group Swollen Members.

Swollen Members